Tiabendazole (INN, BAN), also known as thiabendazole (AAN, USAN) or TBZ and the trade names Mintezol, Tresaderm, and Arbotect, is a preservative, an antifungal agent, and an antiparasitic agent.

Uses

Preservative 
Tiabendazole is used primarily to control mold, blight, and other fungal diseases in fruits (e.g. oranges) and vegetables; it is also used as a prophylactic treatment for Dutch elm disease. 

Tiabendazole is also used as a food additive, a preservative with E number E233 (INS number 233).  For example, it is applied to bananas to ensure freshness, and is a common ingredient in the waxes applied to the skins of citrus fruits. It is not approved as a food additive in the EU, Australia and New Zealand.

Use in treatment of aspergillosis has been reported.

It is also used in anti-fungal wallboards as a mixture with azoxystrobin.

Parasiticide 
As an antiparasitic, tiabendazole is able to control roundworms (such as those causing  strongyloidiasis), hookworms, and other helminth species which infect wild animals, livestock, and humans.

Other 
In dogs and cats, tiabendazole is used to treat ear infections.

Tiabendazole is also a chelating agent, which means it is used medicinally to bind metals in cases of metal poisoning, such as lead, mercury, or antimony poisoning.

Research 
Genes responsible for the maintenance of cell walls in yeast have been shown to be responsible for angiogenesis in vertebrates. Tiabendazole serves to block angiogenesis in both frog embryos and human cells. It has also been shown to serve as a vascular disrupting agent to reduce newly established blood vessels. Tiabendazole has been shown to effectively do this in certain cancer cells.

Pharmacodynamics 
Tiabendazole works by inhibition of the mitochondrial, helminth-specific enzyme, fumarate reductase, with possible interaction with endogenous quinone.

Safety 
The substance appears to have a slight toxicity in higher doses, with effects such as liver and intestinal disorders at high exposure in test animals (just below  level). Some reproductive disorders and decreasing weaning weight have been observed, also at high exposure. Effects on humans from use as a drug include nausea, vomiting, loss of appetite, diarrhea, dizziness, drowsiness, or headache; very rarely also ringing in the ears, vision changes, stomach pain, yellowing eyes and skin, dark urine, fever, fatigue, increased thirst and change in the amount of urine occur. Carcinogenic effects have been shown at higher doses.

Synthesis 

Intermediate arylamidine 2 is prepared by aluminium trichloride-catalyzed addition of aniline to the nitrile of 4-cyanothiazole (1). The amidine (2) is then converted to its N-chloro derivative 3 with sodium hypochlorite (NaOCl). Upon treatment with base, this undergoes a nitrene insertion reaction (4) to produce tiabendazole (5).

An alternative synthesis involves reacting 4-thiazolecarboxamide with o-phenylenediamine in polyphosphoric acid.

Derivatives
A number of derivatives of tiabendazole are also pharmaceutical drugs, including
albendazole, cambendazole, fenbendazole, oxfendazole, mebendazole, and flubendazole.

See also 
 Fungicide use in the United States
 List of fungicides

References

External links
 Thiabendazole, Extension Toxicology Network
 Medicinenet: Thiabendazole – Oral

Antiparasitic agents
Benzimidazoles
Fungicides
Preservatives
Thiazoles